Barrau is a surname. Notable people with the surname include:

Aurélien Barrau (born 1973), French physicist and philosopher
Caroline de Barrau (1828–1888), French educationalist, feminist, writer and philanthropist
Laureano Barrau (1863–1957), Spanish painter
Mathieu Barrau (born 1977), French rugby union player
Théophile Barrau (1848–1913), French sculptor
Xavier Barrau (born 1982), French footballer

As a forename:
Barrau de Sescas (fl. 1295-1304), Gascon knight and English admiral

See also
Family of Barrau
Monte Barraù, a mountain of Sicily